The following highways are numbered 761:

Canada

Costa Rica
 National Route 761

United States